Rabbi Simcha Zelig Reguer (1864-1942), שמחה זעליג ריגר  Dayan of Brisk, was the chief Rabbinical judge of Brest-Litovsk and surrounding Lithuania.

Biography
Rabbi Reguer and his family lived in the same house (but on separate floors) as Rabbi Chaim Soloveichik, head of the Volozhin Yeshiva, and his family.

In his memoir, Menachem Begin recalls how Nazi soldiers publicly humiliated Rabbi Reguer in the town square, and slashed his beard. Rabbi Reguer perished in the holocaust along with most of his community.

References

1864 births
1942 deaths
Belarusian Orthodox rabbis
Belarusian Jews who died in the Holocaust
he:שמחה זליג ריגר